Church Brampton was a railway station on the Northampton Loop Line serving the village of Church Brampton in Northamptonshire.

The station was opened on 13 May 1912, to serve the villages of Church Brampton and Harlestone, but primarily the newly opened Northamptonshire Golf Club. It was opened by the London & North Western Railway, which became the London, Midland and Scottish Railway in 1923. The station had a short life of only 19 years, it was closed on 18 May 1931; the reason for the closure was stated to be that most golfers by then arrived by car. All traces of the station were removed when the line was electrified in the 1960s.

See also
 Pitsford and Brampton railway station - A nearby station on the Northampton to Market Harborough line.

References

 The Last Days Of Steam In Northamptonshire, by John M.C. Healy (1989) 
 Northampton Mercury, 17 May 1912 (available through the British Newspaper Archive)

Disused railway stations in Northamptonshire
Former London and North Western Railway stations
Railway stations in Great Britain opened in 1881
Railway stations in Great Britain closed in 1931
1881 establishments in England
West Northamptonshire District